Charles Malamuth (November 9, 1899 – July 14, 1965) was an American journalist, writer, and translator known as an "expert in Slavic languages," "Russian expert," and anticommunist. His best known over the years as translator is Stalin: An Appraisal of the Man and His Influence by Leon Trotsky (1941) for which Soviet communists attacked him as a Trotskyite in the 1940s and Trotskyites attacked him as an anticommunist in the 2010s.

Life

Charles Leo Malamuth (or Goodman) was born on November 9, 1899, in Łódź, Poland (then part of the Russian Empire).  His father was Leo Goodman and mother Cipa (also Celia) Broder.

In the 1920s, Malamuth was a professor in the Slavonic Department at the University of California, Berkeley.

On December 20, 1925, in Sacramento, California, Malamuth married Joan London, daughter of American novelist and socialist Jack London.  It was her second marriage.  They divorced in 1930, moved to Moscow remarried, separated in 1934, and divorced for good in 1935.  By 1950, he was again married to Renee Malamuth.

He corresponded with Max Eastman, Eugene Lyons, Adolphe Menjou, and Lev Trotsky as well as Ilya Ehrenburg, Anatoly Lunacharsky, Aleksei Tolstoi, and Evgeny Zamyatin.  Other friends and acquaintances included Isaac Don Levine. Malamuth served as assistant to Eugene Lyons during the latter's stay there as Moscow bureau chief for United Press.  On November 22, 1930, he accompanied Lyons to an historic interview with Joseph Stalin.

In 1947, he was director of European Public Relations in Paris for the American Jewish Joint Distribution Committee. Around 1950, he left Paris to join Radio Free Europe in Frankfurt, Voice of America, and Radio Liberty.

In 1953, the Communist Party of France attacked him in its newspaper Ce soir by calling him "un fidéle de Trotsky" ("a Trotsky loyalist") and citing his and Lyons support for Victor Kravchenko during the latter's trial in France for his book I Chose Freedom (1949), which exposed the GULAG system in the USSR.  Ce Soir "accused" Malamuth of translating the first 500 pages of Kravchenko's famous book.  Furthermore, the newspaper accused Malamuth of close association with the "Trotskyite Max Eastman" and with Isaac Don Levine.  In addition, his visitors in Paris included ex-CP members Jay Lovestone and Benjamin Gitlow, and he was also known to have visited the US Embassy in Paris weekly (i.e., implying that he was an American spy). Lastly, he had worked for the American Joint Distribution Committee ("Jewish welfare agency"), which the CP USSR had accused of "engineering" the "Doctors Plot."

He died in Los Angeles on July 14, 1965.

Legacy:  Trotsky's Stalin (2016)
While Stalinist communist parties called Malamuth a Trotskyist, Trotskyists considered him an Anti-Communist——and still do to this day.

Case in point: in 2016, Wellred Books published a new translation of Trotsky's biography Stalin by Alan Woods.  For this new translation, Woods consulted not only Harvard University library archives (which holds Trotsky's papers for the book) but also French and Russian translations.  It contains 100,000 words more than Malamuth's 1940 translation.  Also, the new translated presents "Malamuth's political distortions removed."

Robert Sewell of In Defense of Marxism has criticized Malamuth strongly.  He has written, "Whatever Malamuth's talents, this was a political task for which he was completely unsuited."  Trotsky was unhappy with Malamuth because he had shown his unfinished translations to others (specifically Max Shachtman and James Burnham).  For this indiscretion, Trotsky was soon blaming him further:  "He does not know Russian; he does not know English; and he is tremendously pretentious."

In video, he explained about Malamuth:  Clearly, he wasn't in the political state in order the carry out his particular task.  He wasn't qualified enough to carry out this particular task.  Therefore, he introduced into this later edited version a lot of material that he had decided to supplement to Trotsky's work.  These supplements, these additions clearly went against the general thrust of Trotsky's political thought...  Natalia Trotsky... wanted to take out the material that had been put in by Malamuth, that should be replaced by Trotsky's own writing...  Malamuth had given the excuse that a lot of it was repetition...  The main thing also he said that the transcripts had been damaged in the assassination attack in 1940, and some of the material was in disrepair...  There wasn't any damage whatsoever... and files deliberately left out of the book...  A vast number of words had been left out... an extra 100,000 words.  Malamuth's text of about 10,000 were taken out.  Ultimately, Sewell concedes a simpler explanation:  "Following Trotsky's death, the American publishers (Harper and Brothers), who owned the rights to the book, placed Malamuth in charge, not only of the translation, but of 'editing' the final book. For them, this was simply a commercial calculation to salvage the book following the author's death."  In other words, "Trotsky's views did not enter into their calculations."

Given Malamuth's career, it seems clear that Sewell's assessment – that the translation of Trotksy's Stalin was "a political task for which he was completely unsuited" – signaled to fellow Trotskyists Malamuth's career as anti-communist.

Translations 
 Squaring the Circle by Valentine Katayev (1928, 1935)
 The Volga Falls to the Caspian Sea by Boris Pilnyak (New York: Farrar and Rinehart, 1931)
 The Little Golden Calf by Evgeny Petrov (New York: Farrar and Rinehart, 1932)
Chocolate, a novel by Alexander Tarasov-Rodionov;translated from the Russian by Charles Malamuth, (New York: Doubleday, Doran & company, inc., 1932)
 Forward, O Time! by Valentine Katayev (New York:  Holt, Rinehart and Winston, 1933) 
 Forward, O Time! by Valentine Katayev (New York:  Farrar and Rinehart, 1934)
 Fear by Alexander Afinogenov (1934)
 Inga by Anatole Glebov (1934)
 Little Golden America by Evgeny Petrov (1936)
 Lonely White Sail, or Peace is Where the Tempests Blow by Valentine Katayev (New York:  Farrar and Rinehart, 1936)
 Stalin: An Appraisal of the Man and His Influence by Leon Trotsky (1941)

See also
 Joan London
 Leon Trotsky
 Eugene Lyons
 Victor Kravchenko
 Max Eastman
 American Jewish Joint Distribution Committee

References

External links
 
 

1899 births
1965 deaths
Jews from the Russian Empire
20th-century translators
Polish emigrants to the United States
Writers from Łódź
20th-century Polish journalists